Téofilo Colón (20 September 1914 – 31 January 2004) was a Puerto Rican hurdler. He competed in the men's 110 metres hurdles at the 1952 Summer Olympics.

References

1914 births
2004 deaths
Athletes (track and field) at the 1952 Summer Olympics
People from Guayama, Puerto Rico
Puerto Rican male hurdlers
Olympic track and field athletes of Puerto Rico
Central American and Caribbean Games medalists in athletics
Central American and Caribbean Games silver medalists for Puerto Rico
Competitors at the 1938 Central American and Caribbean Games
Competitors at the 1946 Central American and Caribbean Games